A cystocarp  is the fruiting structure produced in the red algae after fertilization, especially such a structure having a special protective envelope (as in
Polysiphonia). The structure from which carpospores are released.

References 

Algal anatomy